Murat Ahsen-Böre (Tatar: Морат Әхсән Бүре, Morat Äxsän Büre; September 20, 1919 – 1968) was a Finnish ice hockey player. He began his career with Ilves in 1935, and remained with the team until 1938. He later returned to play one season with HJK Helsinki. His brothers Feyzi, Zeyd, and Vasif were also hockey players. Their father was the Tatar businessman Zinnetullah Ahsen Böre.

Career statistics

References

1919 births
1968 deaths
Finnish ice hockey players
Finnish people of Tatar descent
Ilves players
Ice hockey people from Helsinki